Quentin Bataillon (born 9 September 1993) is a French politician from La République En Marche! and a member of the National Assembly for Loire's 1st constituency.

References 

1993 births
Living people
21st-century French politicians
Agir (France) politicians
La République En Marche! politicians
Deputies of the 16th National Assembly of the French Fifth Republic

Members of Parliament for Loire